Censorship by country collects information on censorship, Internet censorship, freedom of the press, freedom of speech, and human rights by country and presents it in a sortable table, together with links to articles with more information. In addition to countries, the table includes information on former countries, disputed countries, political sub-units within countries, and regional organizations.

Table

Maps

Freedom of the Press Report
2015 Freedom of the Press Classifications

Press Freedom Index
2014 Press Freedom Index

Internet censorship and surveillance
Internet censorship and surveillance by country (2018)OpenNet Initiative "Summarized global Internet filtering data spreadsheet", 29 October 2012 and "Country Profiles", the OpenNet Initiative is a collaborative partnership of the Citizen Lab at the Munk School of Global Affairs, University of Toronto; the Berkman Center for Internet & Society at Harvard University; and the SecDev Group, Ottawa

YouTube blocking

See also

 Censorship
 Censorship in South Asia
 Internet censorship
 Internet censorship by country
 Human rights
 Human rights by country
 Human rights in Africa
 Human rights in Asia
 Human rights in Central Asia
 Human rights in East Asia
 Human rights in Europe
 Human rights in the Middle East
 Human rights in Latin America
  Blasphemy
  Blasphemy law by country
 Freedom of speech
 Freedom of speech by country
 Freedom of the press
 Freedom House
 Freedom of the Press (report)
 Holocaust denial
 Laws against Holocaust denial
 LGBT rights by country or territory
 Religious freedom by country
 Reporters Without Borders
 Press Freedom Index
 Surveillance
 Mass surveillance
 Mass surveillance in the United Kingdom
 Mass surveillance in the United States
 Women's rights by region

References

 This article incorporates licensed material from the Country Profiles, Regional Overviews, and Filtering Maps sections of the OpenNet Initiative web site. Creative Commons Attribution 3.0 Unported license, see the lower right corner of pages at the OpenNet Initiative web site

External links